Pan Yen-hsin (born 18 February 1996) is a Taiwanese footballer who plays as a midfielder for Taiwan Mulan Football League club Inter Taoyuan and the Chinese Taipei women's national team.

References

1996 births
Living people
Women's association football midfielders
Taiwanese women's footballers
Chinese Taipei women's international footballers